Thomas Butler (1951 - 12 November 2020) was an Irish hurler.  At club level he played with Drom & Inch and was also a member of the Tipperary senior hurling team. He usually lined out as a forward.

Career

Butler first came to prominence at juvenile and underage levels with the Drom & Inch club, as well as lining out with Templemore CBS. He made his senior debut at club level as a 15-year-old in 1966 and won two Mid Tipperary Championship titles in a career that spanned four decades. Butler first appeared on the inter-county scene with the Tipperary under-21 team, having earlier failed to make the minor team. His three years in the under-21 grade yielded a Munster Under-21 Championship title in 1972. Butler was later drafted onto the Tipperary senior hurling team and made his debut against Limerick in the last game of the 1973-74 league. His senior career coincided with a barren spell for Tipperary in terms of success, however, he won a National Hurling League medal in 1979, having claimed an All-Star the previous year. Butler also wona  Railway Cup medal with Munster in 1978.

Honours

Team

Drom & Inch
Mid Tipperary Senior Hurling Championship: 1974, 1984

Tipperary
National Hurling League: 1978-79
Munster Under-21 Hurling Championship: 1972

Munster
Railway Cup: 1978

Individual

Awards
All-Star Award: 1978
RTÉ Goal of the Year: 1979

References

External link

 Tommy Butler profile on Tipp GAA Archives website

1951 births
2020 deaths
Drom-Inch hurlers
Tipperary inter-county hurlers
Munster inter-provincial hurlers